Isobel Richardson is a former association football player who represented New Zealand at international level.

Richardson scored two goals on her Football Ferns début in a 3–2 win over Australia on 1 September 1975 at the inaugural AFC Women's Asian Cup. Her second and final appearance was a 3–1 win over Thailand two days later at the same tournament.

Honours

New Zealand
AFC Women's Championship: 1975

References

Year of birth missing (living people)
Living people
New Zealand women's international footballers
New Zealand women's association footballers
Women's association footballers not categorized by position